Michael Henshall (29 February 1928 – 7 February 2017) was a long serving Suffragan Bishop of Warrington.

Henshall was educated at Manchester Grammar School and St Chad's College, Durham. He was ordained in 1957 and  began his career with a curacy in Bridlington before Incumbencies at Micklehurst and Altrincham. From there he ascended to the Episcopate of Warrington a post he held for 20 years, retiring in 1996.

His son, Nicholas Henshall, has been Dean of Chelmsford since 2014.

He died on 7 February 2017 at the age of 88.

References

1928 births
2017 deaths
People educated at Manchester Grammar School
Alumni of St Chad's College, Durham
Bishops of Warrington
20th-century Church of England bishops